The 60th New York Film Festival took place from September 30 to October 16, 2022. Noah Baumbach's White Noise was selected to be the Opening Night film of the festival (an identical position received by the movie for the 79th Venice Film Festival), while Laura Poitras' documentary All the Beauty and the Bloodshed was chosen to be NYFF's Centerpiece (the movie also is bound to a Venice World Premiere, a North American premiere at the 49th Telluride Film Festival and a Canadian premiere at the 47th Toronto International Film Festival, making it the only movie of the 2022 season to hit all the major four fall film festivals). Elegance Bratton's 47th Toronto International Film Festival premiere movie, The Inspection, was selected to be New York Film Festival's closing film, while James Gray's 75th Cannes Film Festival premiered movie, Armageddon Time, was selected to be the festival's celebration movie for its 60th anniversary.

Main slate

Spotlight

Currents

Shorts

References

New York Film Festival
New York
New York Film Festival